Pablo Milanés Arias (24 February 1943 – 22 November 2022) was a Cuban guitar player and singer. He was one of the founders of the Cuban nueva trova, along with Silvio Rodríguez and Noel Nicola. His music, originating in the Trova, Son and other traditional styles of early 20th Century Cuban music, set him apart from the style of Silvio Rodríguez.

Biography
Pablo Milanés, widely known as Pablito, moved with his family from Bayamo to Havana in 1950. He studied in the Conservatorio Municipal de La Habana, at the time the most prestigious musical school in the country. His first public performance was in 1956. By age 15, he was active in "bohemian" musical circles in Havana, associated with the so-called "filin" musicians.

Although he supported the Cuban Revolution, in 1965 he was sent to the UMAP agricultural forced-labor camp in Camagüey. In 1967, he escaped and fled to Havana to denounce the injustice of the labor camp. This resulted in his imprisonment, first for two months in La Cabaña, an 18th-century fortress in Havana, and then for a time in a prison camp. He was released when the prison camp was closed due to international pressure.

In 1969, he became part of the Grupo de Experimentación Sonora, a seminal group of young musicians, many of whom became founding members of the nueva trova, which started as a movement with a concert given by Pablo, Silvio Rodriguez, and Noel Nicola on 18 February 1968. Until the late 1980s, nueva trova was the unofficial musical style of the Cuban Revolution.

Since his first recording ("Versos sencillos de José Martí" in 1973), he issued more than 40 solo records, and many more in collaboration with other artists from Cuba, elsewhere in Latin America, and Spain. His first record with original songs (the eponymous "Pablo Milanés") was not issued until 1976. The heyday of his creativity occurred probably in the early 1980s, with his records "El guerrero", "Yo me quedo", and "Comienzo y final de una verde mañana".

Within the context of the nueva trova, Pablo was widely considered one of the closest to the traditional roots of Cuban music, while being open to diverse musical influences from other contemporary traditions, such as Brazilian music and Blues. The range of his compositions extended from starkly political anthems to inspired love songs. He set the poems of Cuban writers such as José Martí and Nicolás Guillén to music. Some of his most important musical influences were María Teresa Vera, Lorenzo Hierrezuelo, Barbarito Diez, Benny Moré, Lucho Gatica, and Johann Sebastian Bach.

He lived in Vigo, Spain, with his Spanish wife and two sons since 2004. In 2014, he received a kidney transplant, receiving an organ donated by his wife.

Since relocating to Spain, Milanés was publicly critical of some aspects of the Cuban government, though he remained dedicated to the Cuban Revolution. In 2011, it was reported that his willingness to speak openly about the failures of the revolution strained his relations with Silvio Rodriguez. At that time, he did not participate in pro-government campaigns.

Discography
 1974 – Versos José Martí Cantados por Pablo Milanés
 1975 – Canta a Nicolás Guillén
 1976 – Pablo Milanés
 1978 – No me pidas
 1979 – Aniversario
 1979 – Años with Luis Peña
 1980 – Canta a la resistencia popular chilena
 1981 – El pregón de las flores with Lilia Vera
 1981 – Filin
 1982 – Yo me quedo
 1983 – El guerrero
 1984 – Comienzo y final de una verde mañana
 1984 – Ao vivo no Brasil
 1986 – Querido Pablo
 1986 – Años 2 with Luis Peña and Octavio Sánchez (Cotán)
 1987 – Buenos días América
 1987 – Trovadores with Armando Garzón
 1988 – Proposiciones
 1989 – Filin 2
 1989 – Filin 3
 1990 – Identidad
 1991 – Canto de la abuela
 1991 – Filin 4
 1991 – Filin 5
 1992 – Años 3 with Luis Peña (El Albino), Compay Segundo, and Octavio Sánchez (Cotán)
 1994 – Canta boleros en Tropicana
 1994 – Evolución
 1994 – Igual que ayer with Caco Senante
 1994 – Orígenes
 1995 – Plegaria
 1995 – Si yo volviera a nacer
 1995 – Blanco y negro with Víctor Manuel
 1997 – Despertar
 1998 – Vengo naciendo
 2000 – Días de gloria
 2000 – Live from New York City
 2002 – Pablo querido
 2005 – Como un campo de maíz
 2005 – Líneas paralelas with Andy Montañez
 2007 – Regalo
 2007 – Pablo Milanés en vivo: Amor y desamor
 2008 – Raúl y Pablo with Raúl Torres
 2008 – Más allá de todo with Chucho Valdés
 2008 – Feeling 6
 2011 – Pablo y Lynn Milanés en concierto with daughter Lynn Milanés
 2013 – Renacimiento
 2014 – Canción de otoño
 2015 – 50 de 22
 2016 – Flores del futuro with Miguel Núñez
 2017 – Amor with daughter Haydée Milanés

References

External links 
Songs and Discographie by Pablo Milanés in CANCIONEROS.COM
Che, Guía y Ejemplo: – Song of Pablo Milanés dedicated to Che Guevara
Evento en New York – Evento de Pablo Milanés en New York Sep 9
Official Website
 
 

1943 births
2022 deaths
Cuban male singers
Cuban songwriters
Latin Grammy Award winners
Latin Grammy Lifetime Achievement Award winners
Latin music songwriters
Male songwriters
Nueva canción musicians
People from Bayamo
Wrasse Records artists